Jean Talon (1626 – 1694) was the first Intendant of New France.

Jean Talon or Jean-Talon may also refer to:

Places
Jean-Talon, an electoral district in Quebec, Canada
Jean Talon Building, a government office building in Ottawa, Canada
Jean-Talon Market in Montreal

Transit
Jean-Talon Street on the Island of Montreal
Jean-Talon station (Montreal Metro), in Montreal
Jean-Talon station, now Parc station, a multimodal station in Montreal